Scoparia caradjai is a moth in the family Crambidae. It was described by Patrice J.A. Leraut in 1986. It is found in the Chinese provinces of Zhejiang, Jiangsu and Jiangxi.

The length of the forewings is 8–10.5 mm. The forewings are brown with black suffusion and with a blackish-brown stripe basally. The antemedian, postmedian and subterminal lines are white. The hindwings are greyish white to pale brown.

References

Moths described in 1986
Scorparia